Chekshino is a rural locality (a village) and the administrative center of Dvinitskoye Rural Settlement, Sokolsky District, Vologda Oblast, Russia. The population was 566 as of 2002. There are 5 streets.

Geography 
Chekshino is located 47 km northeast of Sokol (the district's administrative centre) by road. Osipovo is the nearest rural locality.

References 

Rural localities in Sokolsky District, Vologda Oblast